Farida Mohammad Ali (Arabic, فريدة محمد علي) (born 1963 in Kerbala, Iraq) is an Iraqi singer.  She performs regularly in the Iraqi Maqam Ensemble. The ensemble was established in 1989 in Baghdad by Mohammad H.Gomar to continue of the 1973 ensemble organized by the prominent lute professor Munir Bashir.  She had taught maqam singing at the Baghdad Conservatory. She left Iraq in 1997. She is married to Mohammad Gomar the Djozza instrument player and lives in the Netherlands. 

She was the recipient of the Medal Algeria Capital of Arab Culture in 2007.  She performed in International Mystic Music Sufi Festival in Karachi, Pakistan in 2007.

Discography
Farida and the Iraqi Maqam Ensemble, Classical Music of Iraq (Music and Words, 1998)
Farida and the Iraqi Maqam Ensemble, Iraqi Mawal & maqam (produced by Samarkand company in the Netherlands 2000)
Farida and the Iraqi Maqam Ensemble, Departure (Produced by the Dutch company Soly Luna 2001)
Farida and the Iraqi Maqam Ensemble, Tradition (Produced by Munir Bashir Foundation 2002)
Farida and the Iraqi Maqam Ensemble, Voice of Mesopotamia (Produced By Long Distance France, 2003)
Farida and the Iraqi Maqam Ensemble, Baghdad Eternity (Poems & Maqamat) (Produced by Iraqi Maqam Foundation 2004)
Farida and the Iraqi Maqam Ensemble, Ishraqaat (Produced by Snail Records 2005)

See also
Music of Iraq

External links
Site on Farida and the Iraqi Maqam Ensemble
Record label
Artistic portrait on BBC site
Article on maqam singing in Iraq
Statement at WOMAD festival supporting arms control

1963 births
Living people
Iraqi Shia Muslims
20th-century Iraqi women singers
People from Karbala
21st-century Iraqi women singers